The Parliament of Queensland is the legislature of Queensland, Australia. As provided under the Constitution of Queensland, the Parliament consists of the Monarch of Australia and the Legislative Assembly. It has been the only unicameral state legislature in the country since the upper chamber, the Legislative Council, was abolished in 1922. The Legislative Assembly sits in Parliament House in the state capital, Brisbane.

All laws applicable in Queensland are authorised by the Parliament of Queensland, with the exception of specific legislation defined in the Constitution of Australia, very limited criminal law applying under the Australia Act 1986 as well as a small volume of remaining historical laws passed by the Parliament of New South Wales and the Imperial Parliament.

Following the outcome of the 2015 election, successful amendments to the electoral act in early 2016 include: adding an additional four parliamentary seats from 89 to 93, changing from optional preferential voting to full-preferential voting, and moving from unfixed three-year terms to fixed four-year terms.

History
The Parliament was founded 22 May 1860, less than a year after the Colony of Queensland was created in June 1859. It was convened at military and convict barracks converted for the purpose located on Queen Street, Brisbane. Immigration was an important issue for the early Parliament. Population growth was encouraged with new settlers enticed by land ownership.

In 1915, Queensland became the first state to make voting compulsory at state elections.

Since 1 April 2003, live audio broadcasts have streamed through the internet from the Parliament while it is in session. In June 2007, the Parliament started broadcasting video of parliamentary proceedings. Nine in-house television cameras are used to record sessions.

The first female Speaker, Fiona Simpson was elected on 15 May 2012.

Membership

The Assembly has 93 Members of Parliament (MPs). These are intended to represent approximately the same population in each electorate. Voting is by the Full Preferential Voting system (FPV), with elections held approximately once every three years.

In April 2016, legislation was passed to increase the number of seats in the parliament by four to a total of 93. An amendment was also passed to abolish optional preferential voting. A referendum held the previous month was passed, supporting a bill to establish fixed four-year terms.

Royal assent
The role of the monarch in Parliament is to give royal assent to legislation. This function is in practice exercised by the Governor of Queensland, who conventionally will never refuse assent to a bill that has passed the Legislative Assembly. The party or coalition with the most seats in the house is invited by the Governor to form a government.

The leader of that party subsequently becomes Premier of Queensland, leading a Cabinet of Ministers. In the Liberal National Party, the Premier selects members of their party to act as Ministers. In the Labor Party, the Ministers are elected by partyroom ballot, with the Leader then assigning ministerial portfolios to each one.

Operations
Once all winning candidates have been declared, the Governor of Queensland proclaims a date for the start of the new Parliament. It is the role of the Clerk of the Parliament to call members to attendance.

According to the Constitution of Queensland, members of Parliament must swear an oath or affirmation to the Monarch of Australia as well as an oath of office before signing a Roll of Members. The Clerk of the Parliament has the power to swear in members.

Sworn-in representatives are required to elect a Speaker to preside over the House's business. Before this occurs the Clerk may select and point to the next member who may speak. Once elected the Speaker is dragged to the chair and presented to the Governor at Government House. The ceremonial opening of the new Parliament is marked by a speech by the Governor. Traditionally the speech is written by the new government and it may outline current activities, budget details, statistics and proposed lists of legislation which are intended to be introduced.

A day in Parliament usually begins with housekeeping matters, including prayers, notifications and the tabling of any documents. An opportunity is then given to Ministers to make statements. During a period of no more than an hour, known as question time, any member may pose a question to a Minister.

Distribution of seats

As of 31 October 2020, the composition of Parliament is:

 47 votes as a majority are required to pass legislation.

See also

 Parliaments of the Australian states and territories
 Legislative Assembly of Queensland
 List of members of the Queensland Legislative Assembly
 Second Palaszczuk Ministry

References

Further reading

External links

 

 
Queensland
Queensland
1860 establishments in Australia